Noel Edwin Manoukian (January 1, 1938 — May 28, 2001) was a justice of the Supreme Court of Nevada from 1977 to 1985.

Early life and education
Manoukian was born on January 1, 1938, in Livingston, California. He received his Bachelor of Arts in 1961 from University of the Pacific and Juris Doctor from the University of Santa Clara in 1964.

Manoukian's son, Joseph, was sentenced to jail in 2001 where he hanged himself after five days.

Career
Manoukian became a deputy district attorney in Douglas County from 1965 to 1966. He then worked in private practice in  Carson City, from 1965 until 1974. He then became a judge from the 1st Judicial District Court. Manoukian was appointed to the Nevada Supreme Court in 1977, serving as chief justice from 1983–1985. He retired from the court in 1985.

References

1938 births
2001 deaths
Justices of the Nevada Supreme Court
People from Merced County, California
Santa Clara University alumni
Chief Justices of the Nevada Supreme Court
20th-century American judges